Jack McKenzie, MacKenzie or Mackenzie may refer to:

Jack Mackenzie (1888–1984), Canadian civil engineer and academic
Jack MacKenzie (cinematographer) (1892–1979), British cinematographer
Jack McKenzie (actor) (born 1942), Scottish actor
Jack MacKenzie (footballer, born 2000), Scottish footballer (Aberdeen FC)
Jack McKenzie (footballer, born 1881) (1881–1946), Australian rules footballer, known as 'Dookie'
Jack McKenzie (footballer, born 1908) (1908–?), Australian rules footballer, son of 'Dookie'
Jack McKenzie (ice hockey) (born 1930), Canadian ice hockey player

See also
John Mackenzie (disambiguation)
John McKenzie (disambiguation)
Jack McKinney (disambiguation)